This is a list of the 91 original (pre-war) Martin D-45s made by C.F. Martin & Co. between the years 1933 and 1942, generally recognized to be the most desired, and highly valued, acoustic guitars ever made; in American Guitars - An Illustrated History, author Tom Wheeler describes them as "among American guitar's irreplaceable treasures". It is not known exactly how many still survive, however as information is available in print form or via web information, sale inventories, and so on, it can be collated here.

Serial numbers and years, with notes as available 
The listing of serial numbers presented below is from Mike Longworth's book "Martin Guitars - A History", while associated information is from other sources as available, one particularly valuable source being  the Martin D-45 Master List by Robert (Bob) Hamilton and Bruce Herrmann. Instruments marked "[E]" are those known to exist according to either information contained herein or a separate version of the Martin D-45 Master List.

Miscellaneous
George Gruhn, the well known Nashville instrument dealer talks in this 2010 interview with "Guitar International" magazine about his one time considerable collection of vintage style 45 Martin instruments including 6 pre-war D-45s. This collection was sold in 1976 to finance the purchase of his house and the building in which his business was located. The "best sounding" (1942) D-45 was sold to Kentucky musician and repairman Harry Sparks for $7,500 and can be seen in this video interview of Vince Gill, who also owned the instrument for a while and has it on loan as at 2016 (serial number not known).

The well known  U.S.-based Japanese collector Mac Yasuda has an extensive collection of American vintage guitars including 14 original D-45s according to this report among others, some of which are detailed in the section above. In 2001 he published "The Vintage Guitar Vol. 3" which includes one photo of 12 D-45s as reproduced here, as well as individual photos of 4 instruments. In 2010 he published another illustrated book in Japan, the "Martin Guitar Book" as detailed here, which shows two D-45s (one pre-war s/n 75594, one recent) on the front cover. Among his collection is a 1940 (or 1941) D-45 previously owned by Bernie Leadon, another is s/n 74011 originally custom built for Ken MacKenzie (see relevant entry in main numeric section above); another is reportedly an instrument previously owned and played by Charlie Monroe which was purchased new in 1942. Mr Yasuda is shown holding one of his D-45s, with a portion of his collection behind, in this photograph.

The late Steven Kern Shaw, son of well known clarinetist Artie Shaw and grandson of Broadway composer Jerome Kern, has donated his substantial collection of iconic 20th century American-made instruments - including historic Gibson mandolins and Martin guitars - to Belmont University in Nashville as of November 2016, where they went on display in a museum opened in Spring 2017. This collection includes four pre-war Martin D-45s according to this press release, which also shows George Gruhn holding one of the pre-war D-45s (a 1939 instrument); the collection includes #82572, the last pre-war D-45 made, and also #72160 as well.

Marty Stuart currently owns and performs with a 1940 D-45 (#74165) which he obtained from Johnny Cash. The instrument has a pearl patch in the front (engraved "CASH") where some spruce was once damaged (example photos here and here). Tut Taylor states here that he originally acquired the guitar and sold it to Hank Williams, Jr, who later traded it to Johnny Cash; the same site includes some pictures of this guitar as originally published in "Best of Guitar Player: Vintage Gallery", July 1994. (The assertion repeated in Vintage Gallery that the guitar once belonged to Hank Williams, Sr., appears to be incorrect cf. the Tut Taylor recollection cited). A recent article on Stuart and his collection in "Guitar Aficionado" magazine here discusses this instrument in some depth. A second D-45 previously belonging to both Cash and Stuart is mentioned in this forum post.

At some point, Gruhn Guitars sold 2 Martin D-45s previously belonging to Wilma Lee Cooper, dated 1938 (this one with snowflake inlays and an oversize pickguard, previously owned by Lee Moore, Gruhn inventory number AA6291, serial number not known) and 1942 (s/n 82569, Gruhn inventory number AA6290; the latter is mis-labelled a D-43 on the Gruhn site). The guitars are illustrated here, including this picture of Wilma Lee with the 1938 guitar; at that time the 1942 D-45 had a sale price of $100,000. More recently, the 1942 instrument was again sold by Gruhn in 2016 (inventory no. AA9087, asking price $195,000) and is now owned by performer and songwriter Gillian Welch; this picture shows Gillian on stage with this guitar. Wilma Lee was also an owner of #72460 (1939), refer main list.

Actor and some time guitarist Steven Seagal possesses a pre-war D-45 with snowflake inlays (circa 1938) according to a 2006 interview with "Vintage Guitar" magazine reproduced here; the same guitar is shown briefly in this video.

This video of the Songbirds Guitar Museum in Chattanooga includes footage of 2 pre-war Martin D-45s in that collection: one is no. 78629 (1941) as mentioned in the main list, the date and serial number of the other is not known at this time.

A 1939 D-45 (serial number not stated) is illustrated and discussed by George Gruhn in the July 2004 issue of "Vintage Guitar" magazine.

A 1940 D-45 (serial number not stated) is presently in Hank Risan's Museum of Modern Instruments (MOMI) collection. This collection also formerly housed a 1941 D-45 originally owned by Bob Wills, #79586, refer above section.

A 1940 D-45 (serial number not stated) was being offered for sale by Gruhn Guitars in 2008/9 (inventory no. AA7977), asking price unknown. Another 1940 D-45 (serial number not stated), refinished, is on sale at Gruhn for $195,000 as at June 2015 (inventory no. AA9506).

A 1940 D-45 (serial number not stated) in superb condition, photographed in the UK is illustrated in this Getty Images entry; the same image is used as an example of a 1940 D-45 on p. 33 of "The Ultimate Guitar Sourcebook" by Tony Bacon.

U.S. Country artist Doyle Dykes owns a 1940 D-45 (serial number not stated), pictured in the May 2020 issue of Vintage Guitar magazine. According to the article, at one point in the 1950s this instrument had to be returned to the Martin factory for a replacement top, and was fitted with a "plain", D-28 style top lacking the distinctive D-45 abalone trim. The guitar was originally owned by Dykes' uncle Doyle "Smitty" Smith, a professional guitarist in Washington, D.C., and came into Dykes' possession on his uncle's death; in 1988 Dykes gifted the instrument to country artist Roy Clark, and on the latter's death in 2018, his widow returned the instrument to Dykes. A photograph of this instrument in the hands of its original owner, before its top replacement, is included in the magazine article, and shows it to have originally been fitted with an unusual, large and asymmetrical double pickguard. Several samples of Doyle playing this instrument are available on Youtube, example here.

A 1941 D-45 (serial number not stated, no other information given) is illustrated here.

A 1941 D-45 (serial number not stated), refinished with "multiple professionally repaired top cracks" and other issues was being offered for sale by Gruhn Guitars in 2007, inventory no. AA7628, asking price $85,000.

A 1942 D-45, in superb condition (serial number not stated), was featured in "Vintage Guitar" magazine, May 2009, copy available here.

A 1942 D-45 (serial number not stated, peghead repair by Dan Erlewine) was being offered for sale by Gruhn Guitars in 2007, asking price $175,000, inventory no. AA7596 subsequently sold, archived details shown on Gruhn web site here.

This Facebook page includes photos of various D-45s, both original and reissues.

An article entitled "Martin D-45: A Chronicle of the Jewelled Dreadnought" appeared in the Japanese magazine "Acoustic Guitar Magazine", volume 4,  Spring 2000 (Rittor Music, 2000)

Some links to vintage film clips featuring Wilma Lee Cooper and Red Smiley playing their pre-war D-45s are given here. Other 1930s-1960s country / bluegrass performers who have been pictured with their D-45s include Gene Autry (owner of the first D-45 guitar), Jackie "Kid" Moore, Jimmy Martin, Charlie Monroe, Skeeter Bonn, Toby Stroud, Ken MacKenzie, Smiley Maxedon (see information above for #81578), Ernest Tubb, Red Allen (whose D-45 was apparently loaned to him by his group's bass player, Tom Morgan), and Nolan "Cowboy Slim" Rinehart.

Original list price and present value
The D-45 was available only by special order until the late 1930s, when a flyer listed it as available as part of the regular Martin dreadnaught line for the price of $225, as compared with $75 for a D-18 and $115 for a D-28 (the list price on Gene Autry's initial 1933 order was $200, plus an additional $10 for the custom pearl inlay on the headstock and the bridge). When last available new from the Martin Guitar Company, the 1942 D-45 retailed at $250 (letter from Martin Guitar Company to Mr. Harold Wagler dated October 1963, reproduced here), equivalent to approximately $3,630 in 2014 dollars as a straight conversion, however bearing in mind average incomes of the time, could be construed as between $6,700 and $11,100 in today's terms (same reference, calculated as labor value/income value). In accordance with its gradual acceptance as possibly the finest production steel-string acoustic guitar ever made, the value of an all original, pre-war Martin D45 has gone up considerably over the intervening 70+ years. In a Vintage Guitar Price Survey published by "Frets" magazine in May 1988, a 1939 D-45 in mint condition was estimated at average dealer price $15,000 (range $6,000-$22,000) and a 1942 D-45 (similar) at $13,000 (range $6,000-$21,000). By 2002 the Vintage Guitar Price Guide listed prices of up to $200,000 for 1936–1937 D-45s and up to $150,000 for 1940–1942 models. By 2011 a valuation of $375,000 was being cited for a newly discovered 1942 example, with values suggested elsewhere in the range $175,000-$350,000 according to condition and rarity. According to a post in the Unofficial Martin Guitar Forum, a  1938 snowflake D-45 with forward-X bracing in "excellent original condition" recently changed hands for $400,000 in a private sale.

References

Martin
Martin D-45s